Idanre town known previously as Ufe Oke is an historic town in Ondo State, and the headquarters of the Idanre Local Government Area which carries its name. The town is located at the foot of the scenic Idanre Hill which is of unique cultural and environmental significance, and attracts many tourists.

The postal code of the area is 340. Idanre is Nigeria's largest cocoa producing area. Idanre is mainly a Yoruba speaking tribe (Similar Ondo Dialect) with the majority Into farming and trading.

History
Ufe Oke was founded by Olofen Aremitan from the Oduduwa royal household who was said to have left Ife with his band of followers with an item of inestimable value, a brass crown (Ade Ude).
Idanre is made up of three disjointed township or localities, namely; Atosin, Alade and Odode (Ode Idanre). Although Ode Idanre is the major township with more populace and land area than the other two smaller localities, the others have always been recognized by the inhabitants independently. The Idanre Hil, or Oke Idanre is located in Idanre town in Ondo State of southwestern Nigeria. It was in these hills that the people of Ufe oke (Ife of the mountains) lived for more than eight hundred years before they finally descended into the plains in the year 1932. The old site still remains in the hills, accessible through a 660 step ascent that leads up into the hills.

Site description 

The hill of Idanre is one of the most beautiful natural landscapes in Nigeria. It includes such cultural sites as "Owa's Palace, Shrines, Old Court, Belfry, Agbooogun footprint, thunder water (Omi Apaara) and burial mounds and grounds". On getting to the entrance of the hill you will see a great tree at the entrance of the ancient city of Idanre called the IRAYE TREE, then you can now get prepared to take the steps to the great city beyond the hills of Idanre.

World Heritage status 

This site was added to the UNESCO World Heritage Tentative List on October 8, 2007, in the Cultural category.

Wildlife 
Amietophrynus perreti, or the Perret's toad, is only known from a single locality at the Idanre Hill. The five sites where forest elephants are found in southern Nigeria are the Omo Forests in Ogun State, the Okomu National Park in Edo State, the Cross River National Park in Cross River State, the IDANRE FORESTS and Osse River Park in Ondo State and the Andoni Island in Rivers State. [Nigerian Conservation Foundation (NCF) ]

References

Local Government Areas in Ondo State
Towns in Yorubaland
Articles containing video clips